Actinoschoenus quadricostatus, commonly known as four-ribbed actinoschoenus, is a sedge in the sedge family, Cyperaceae, that is native to Western Australia. It is found in a small area in the Kimberley region.

References

quadricostatus
Plants described in 2015
Angiosperms of Western Australia
Taxa named by Barbara Lynette Rye
Taxa named by Russell Lindsay Barrett
Taxa named by Matthew David Barrett